José Manuel Rodríguez Benito (born 3 March 1992), known as Chema, is a Spanish professional footballer who plays for SD Eibar. Mainly a central defender, he can also play as a left-back.

Club career

Early years
A product of Elche CF's youth system, Chema was born in Caudete, Province of Albacete, and he made his senior debut in 2010 with the reserves. In the following seasons he competed in Tercera División and Segunda División B, representing Atlético Madrid's C and B teams.

Alcorcón
Chema signed with AD Alcorcón in January 2013, being initially assigned to the B side in the fourth division. He was promoted to the first team in August, making his competitive debut on 6 October by starting in a 0–0 away draw against SD Eibar in the Segunda División.

Chema scored his first professional goal on 30 March 2014, his team's only in the 3–1 away loss to Girona FC. On 9 July, he was definitely promoted to the main squad.

Levante
On 5 August 2016, Chema signed a four-year deal with Levante UD, still in the second tier. He contributed three goals in 33 appearances in his first season, helping the club to return to La Liga at the first attempt.

Chema's first match in the Spanish top flight took place on 21 August 2017, when he started a 1–0 home win over Villarreal CF. He scored his first goal in the competition exactly one month later, helping the hosts defeat Real Sociedad 3–0 with a spectacular 44th-minute strike from just outside the box.

Nottingham Forest
On 8 August 2019, Chema joined EFL Championship club Nottingham Forest on a two-year contract for an undisclosed fee. He made his official debut 19 days later, as a substitute in a 3–0 home win against Derby County in the second round of the EFL Cup.

Getafe and Eibar
Chema returned to Spain on 30 January 2020, after being sold to Getafe CF for an undisclosed fee. On 11 January 2022, he was loaned to second division side Eibar for the remainder of the season.

On 21 July 2022, Chema terminated his contract. A few hours later, he returned to Eibar on a three-year deal.

Career statistics

Club

References

External links

1992 births
Living people
Sportspeople from the Province of Albacete
Spanish footballers
Footballers from Castilla–La Mancha
Association football defenders
La Liga players
Segunda División players
Segunda División B players
Tercera División players
Elche CF Ilicitano footballers
Atlético Madrid C players
Atlético Madrid B players
AD Alcorcón B players
AD Alcorcón footballers
Levante UD footballers
Getafe CF footballers
SD Eibar footballers
English Football League players
Nottingham Forest F.C. players
Spanish expatriate footballers
Expatriate footballers in England
Spanish expatriate sportspeople in England